The 2018 U.S. Open (officially known as the Yonex US Open 2018 for sponsorship reasons) was a badminton tournament which took place at Titan Gym in Fullerton, California, United States, from 12 to 17 June 2018 and had a total prize of $150,000.

Tournament
The 2018 U.S. Open was the tenth tournament of the 2018 BWF World Tour and also part of the U.S. Open championships, which had been held since 1954. This tournament was organized by USA Badminton and sanctioned by the BWF.

Venue
This international tournament was held at Titan Gym on the campus of California State University, Fullerton in Fullerton, California, United States.

Point distribution
Below is the point distribution for each phase of the tournament based on the BWF points system for the BWF World Tour Super 300 event.

Prize money
The total prize money for this tournament was US$150,000. Distribution of prize money was in accordance with BWF regulations.

Men's singles

Seeds

 Lin Dan (first round)
 Sameer Verma (withdrew)
 Brice Leverdez (second round)
 Khosit Phetpradab (semi-finals)
 Suppanyu Avihingsanon (second round)
 Mark Caljouw (final)
 Kantaphon Wangcharoen (quarter-finals)
 Ygor Coelho de Oliveira (second round)

Finals

Top half

Section 1

Section 2

Bottom half

Section 3

Section 4

Women's singles

Seeds

 Zhang Beiwen (final)
 Sayaka Sato (second round)
 Michelle Li (semi-finals)
 Aya Ohori (semi-finals)
 Busanan Ongbamrungphan (quarter-finals)
 Pornpawee Chochuwong (quarter-finals)
 Kim Hyo-min (quarter-finals)
 Beatriz Corrales (first round)

Finals

Top half

Section 1

Section 2

Bottom half

Section 3

Section 4

Men's doubles

Seeds

 Marcus Ellis / Chris Langridge (quarter-finals)
 Manu Attri / B. Sumeeth Reddy (first round)
 Tinn Isriyanet / Kittisak Namdash (first round)
 Mark Lamsfuß / Marvin Emil Seidel (first round)
 Josche Zurwonne / Jones Ralfy Jansen (quarter-finals)
 Nipitphon Phuangphuapet / Nanthakarn Yordphaisong (second round)
 Robin Tabeling / Jelle Maas (second round)
 Han Chengkai / Zhou Haodong (second round)

Finals

Top half

Section 1

Section 2

Bottom half

Section 3

Section 4

Women's doubles

Seeds

 Naoko Fukuman / Kurumi Yonao (semi-finals)
 Selena Piek / Cheryl Seinen (second round)
 Émilie Lefel / Anne Tran (second round)
 Isabel Herttrich / Carla Nelte (second round)

Finals

Top half

Section 1

Section 2

Bottom half

Section 3

Section 4

Mixed doubles

Seeds

 Marcus Ellis / Lauren Smith (quarter-finals)
 Mark Lamsfuß / Isabel Herttrich (semi-finals)
 Jacco Arends / Selena Piek (first round)
 Marvin Emil Seidel / Linda Efler (final)
 Chan Peng Soon / Goh Liu Ying (champions)
 Lu Kai / Chen Lu (quarter-finals)
 Ben Lane / Jessica Pugh (semi-finals)
 Cheryl Seinen / Robin Tabeling (second round)

Finals

Top half

Section 1

Section 2

Bottom half

Section 3

Section 4

References

External links
 Tournament Link

U.S. Open Badminton Championships
US Open
US Open
US Open